Surveyor General of Sri Lanka is the head of Department of Survey of Sri Lanka. The post was established on 2 August 1800 with the formation of the Surveyor General's Department by a proclamation of Governor Frederick North at Galle. Joseph Jonville was appointed as the Colonial Surveyor General, residing principally in Colombo and receiving orders directly from the government. Under him five principal surveyors were appointed and the land divided among them in the following manner. "One shall superintend the survey from the River of Chilaw to the Calanie Ganga, one from the Calanie Ganga to the River of Galle, one from the River of Galle to the North Easterly extremity of the Mahagampatto: to the Nothern extremity of the District of Mulletivoe, and the remaining one from the Northern extremity of the District of Mulletivoe to the River of Chilaw, and shall be thus distinguished, the Surveyor of Negombo, of Colombo, of Matara, of Trincomalee, of Jaffna-Patam." The post of Surveyor General was often combined with that of Civil Engineer and Commissioner of Roads. The department, during the first fifty years, was mainly engaged in the survey of scattered allotments of land for sale to private parties. The first title plan was issued by the new department on 20 August 1800 surveyed by C. Schneider.

The current Surveyor General is A. Dissanayake.

List of Surveyors General

References

External links
 Survey Department of Sri Lanka